Benzoyl-CoA is a molecule implied in the activity of the different enzymes 4-hydroxybenzoyl-CoA reductase, benzoyl-CoA reductase, benzoyl-CoA 3-monooxygenase, benzoate-CoA ligase, 2alpha-hydroxytaxane 2-O-benzoyltransferase, anthranilate N-benzoyltransferase, biphenyl synthase, glycine N-benzoyltransferase, ornithine N-benzoyltransferase and phenylglyoxylate dehydrogenase (acylating).

It is a substrate in the formation of xanthonoids in Hypericum androsaemum by benzophenone synthase, condensing a molecule of benzoyl-CoA with three malonyl-CoA, yielding to 2,4,6-trihydroxybenzophenone. This intermediate is subsequently converted by a benzophenone 3′-hydroxylase, a cytochrome P450 monooxygenase, leading to the formation of 2,3′,4,6-tetrahydroxybenzophenone.

Benzoyl-CoA is a substrate of benzoyl-CoA reductase.  This enzyme is responsible in part for the reductive dearomatization of aryl compounds mediated by bacteria under anaerobic conditions.

References

Thioesters of coenzyme A